Favocassidulina  is a foraminiferal genus; rotaliid family Cassidulinidae, known from the middle Miocene to recent in the Indian and Pacific oceans. Its habitat is benthic, near shore.

The test wall is calcareous, finely perforate; primary wall indistinctly optically radial, as the calcite crystals are dendritic in form and occur in bundles; inner and outer surface of the wall covered by a microgranular veneer. Variation in wall structure results in thick walls appearing optically granular. The surface is covered with a secondarily formed honeycomb network of narrow elevated ridges forming polygonal open areas.

References
 Alfred R. Loeblich, jr. and Helen Tappan, 1964. Sarcodina, chiefly "Thecamoebians" and Foraminiferida. Treatise on Invertebrate Paleontology, Part C, Protista 2.  Geological Society of America and University of Kansas Press, 1964.
Forminiferal Genera and their classification. 

Cassidulinidae
Rotaliida genera